Tommy Manning (born 1975) is an American mountain and distance runner.

Manning was a member of the 2010 United States Mountain Running Team that placed second at the World Mountain Running Championships in Kamnik, Slovenia. Manning finished 18th overall out of 149 runners.  Manning won the 2004 Tulsa Run in Tulsa, Oklahoma, finished second at the 2009 Pikes Peak Ascent, and finished 34th overall at the 2009 Boston Marathon.

Manning was a mountain running uphill specialist and won two Masters World Mountain Running Championships. His first World Championship was won in 2013 in Janske Lazne, Czech Republic.  His second World Championship was won in 2018 in Zelezniki, Slovenia.

Born in Tulsa, Manning attended Booker T. Washington High School.  Prior to graduating, Manning was involved in a serious motorcycle accident and suffered a career threatening injury.  Manning also cross country at the University of the South where he won a Cross Country Championship.

Manning lived in Colorado and taught at Fountain Valley boarding school up until 2017, when he moved to Switzerland and began teaching at TASIS, The American School in Switzerland. He taught as a math teacher for 4 years before leaving TASIS.

References

1975 births
Living people
American male mountain runners
American male long-distance runners
Booker T. Washington High School (Tulsa, Oklahoma) alumni